The 1945–46 Taça de Portugal was the eighth season of the Taça de Portugal (English: Portuguese Cup), the premier Portuguese football knockout competition, organized by the Portuguese Football Federation (FPF). Sporting Clube de Portugal was the defending champion and played Atlético Clube de Portugal in the final on 30 June 1946.

Participating Teams

Primeira Divisão 
(12 Teams)
Associação Académica de Coimbra – Organismo Autónomo de Futebol
Atlético Clube de Portugal 
Clube de Futebol Os Belenenses
Sport Lisboa e Benfica
Boavista Futebol Clube
Sport Lisboa e Elvas
Sporting Clube Olhanense
União Desportiva Oliveirense
Futebol Clube do Porto
Sporting Clube de Portugal
Vitória Sport Clube "de Guimarães"
Vitória Futebol Clube "de Setúbal"

Segunda Divisão 
(4 Teams)
Grupo Desportivo Estoril Praia
Futebol Clube Famalicão
Portimonense Sporting Clube
Clube de Futebol União de Coimbra

First round

Results

Quarterfinals

Results

Semifinals

Results

Final

References

External links
Official webpage 
1945–46 Taça de Portugal at zerozero.pt 

Taça de Portugal seasons
Port
Taca